Suzanne Marie Lenhart (born November 19, 1954) is an American mathematician who works in partial differential equations, optimal control and mathematical biology. She is a Chancellor's Professor of mathematics at the University of Tennessee, an associate director for education and outreach at the National Institute for Mathematical and Biological Synthesis, and a part-time researcher at the Oak Ridge National Laboratory.

Education and career
Lenhart grew up in Louisville, Kentucky, and was educated in the Catholic school system there. She did her undergraduate studies at Bellarmine College in Louisville, where Ralph Grimaldi encouraged her to prepare for graduate studies in mathematics and gave her additional tutoring in number theory. She entered graduate school at the University of Kentucky not knowing what she would specialize in, but in her second year chose partial differential equations. She completed her doctorate in 1981 under the supervision of Lawrence C. Evans, and immediately took a tenure-track faculty position at the University of Tennessee. She added a second part-time position at Oak Ridge in 1987.

Awards and honors
Lenhart was AWM/MAA Falconer Lecturer in 1997, president of the Association for Women in Mathematics in 2001–2003, and AWM/SIAM Sonia Kovalevsky Lecturer in 2010 "in recognition of her significant research in partial differential equations, ordinary differential equations, and optimal control". She was elected as a fellow of the American Association for the Advancement of Science in 2010, and became a Chancellor's Professor and SIAM Fellow in 2011. In 2013, she was selected as a fellow of the American Mathematical Society in the inaugural class. In 2017, she was selected as a fellow of the Association for Women in Mathematics in the inaugural class.

Selected publications
Textbooks
.

Research papers
.
.
.
.

References

External links
Home page
 

1954 births
Living people
20th-century American mathematicians
21st-century American mathematicians
American women mathematicians
Bellarmine University alumni
University of Kentucky alumni
University of Tennessee faculty
Fellows of the American Association for the Advancement of Science
Fellows of the American Mathematical Society
Fellows of the Society for Industrial and Applied Mathematics
Fellows of the Association for Women in Mathematics
Kentucky women mathematicians
20th-century women mathematicians
21st-century women mathematicians
20th-century American women
21st-century American women